Hans Werner is a name. It can refer to:

Hans Thimig, Austrian actor known by his pseudonym Hans Werner
Hans-Werner Goetz, German historian
Hans-Werner Wohlers, German boxer
Hans-Werner Hartl, German footballer
Hans Werner Kettenbach, German journalist and writer
Hans Werner Debrunner, Swiss German historian and theologian
Hans-Werner Bothe, German philosopher and neurosurgeon
Hans-Werner Wanzlick, German chemist
Hans-Werner Seher, German water polo player
Hans Werner Lissmann, British zoologist 
Hans-Werner Schwarz, German politician
Hans Werner Schmidt, German painter, illustrator and etcher
Hans Werner Henze, German composer